Canali is an Italian surname. Notable people with the surname include:

Francesco Canali (1764–1835), Italian cardinal
Mario Canali, Italian painter
Mauro Canali, Italian historian
Nicola Canali (1874–1961), Italian cardinal

Italian-language surnames